Carolyn Finney, colloquially known as "Finney," is an ultimate player for San Francisco Fury and has represented the United States national team multiple times in international competition. She is known as one of the most well-rounded players in the USA Ultimate women's division.

Personal life 
Carolyn Finney was born in August 12, 1987 in San Jose, California. She was raised in San Jose aside from three years living in Germany as a young child. She went to college at the University of California, Santa Barbara where she began majoring in history, transitioned to aquatic biology and finally finished out with a B.S. in Mechanical Engineering. She commuted to San Francisco from Santa Barbara to play for San Francisco Fury for five seasons, starting in 2012, before moving to San Francisco to work as a hardware engineer in 2016.

Ultimate career 
Finney started playing ultimate at the University of California, Santa Barbara with the women's ultimate team, the Burning Skirts. She played with the team for five years (2007-2011). During these years, the Burning Skirts were a powerhouse of the college women's ultimate scene, playing in the championship final every year from 2007-2011 and winning gold in 2009 and 2011. Finney was UCSB's Callahan nominee in 2011 and was a finalist, finishing in the top 5.

From 2007-2009, Finney played for the Santa Barbara Lady Condors and in 2010 she played for San Diego Knock Out. She began playing for San Francisco Fury in 2012 and continues to play with them today. She won club championships with Fury in 2012, 2017, and 2018. In 2012, she won silver at the WFDF World Ultimate and Guts Championships with Fury. Fury, as the highest finishing US team at the 2011 USA Ultimate Club Championships, had earned the right to represent the United States as Team USA at this tournament.

In 2016, Finney won gold representing the United States at the WFDF World Ultimate and Guts Championships on the mixed national team. She also won gold with the United States National Team at the 2017 World Games in Wroclaw, Poland. She was rostered with the USA mixed national team that was scheduled to play at the 2020 WFDF World Ultimate and Guts Championships; however the tournament was canceled due to the COVID-19 pandemic. In 2022, she won another gold at the 2022 World Games in Birmingham, Alabama.

Honors 
 2007, 2008, 2010 Silver - USAU College Championships
 2009, 2011 Gold - USAU College Championships
 2012 Silver - WFDF World Ultimate and Guts Championships
 2016 Gold - WFDF World Ultimate and Guts Championships
 2012, 2017, 2018 Gold - USAU Club Championships
 2017 Gold - World Games
 2018 Ultiworld Women’s Club Player Of The Year
 2018 Ultiworld All-Club 2018: 1st Team (Women’s)
 2019 Ultiworld Women’s Club Offensive Player Of The Year 1st Runner-Up
 2019 Ultiworld All-Club 2019: 1st Team (Women’s)
 2022 Gold - World Games

References 

Living people
1987 births
Sportspeople from San Jose, California
Ultimate (sport) players
University of California, Santa Barbara alumni
Competitors at the 2017 World Games
Competitors at the 2022 World Games
World Games gold medalists
20th-century American women
21st-century American women